This is a list of active duty United States Space Force general officers. There are 24 active duty general officers in the U.S. Space Force: two generals, six lieutenant generals, six major generals, and 10 brigadier generals. All of them transferred from the United States Air Force. Space Force general officers, like in other U.S. armed services, are nominated by the president of the United States and confirmed by the Senate.

List of generals

List of lieutenant generals

List of major generals

List of brigadier generals

List of pending appointments

History

Number of general officers

Before the establishment of the Space Force, the Space Force Planning Task Force considered two different scenarios or models for the number of general officers in the new service: the lean and demanding models. The lean Space Force model called for 41 general officers with three generals, six lieutenant generals, 12 major generals, and 20 brigadier generals. The demanding Space Force model, on the other hand, has 45 general officers with three generals, six lieutenant generals, 13 major generals, and 23 brigadier generals.

By August 2020, General John W. Raymond noted that there would only be 21 general officers in the Space Force. In 2022, this was codified by the James M. Inhofe National Defense Authorization Act for Fiscal Year 2023, specifying the number of statutory billets in each rank: two generals, five lieutenant generals, six major generals, and eight brigadier generals. It also required that a minimum of seven Space Force general officers be assigned at joint duty assignments.

Asked by the United States Senate Committee on Armed Services whether the 21 general officer billets in the Space Force are sufficient, Lieutenant General B. Chance Saltzman, in his written statement in 2022, responded that it is not sustainable. He believes that it is not sufficient to sustain the two four-star posts in the service and effectively represent the Space Force in the Joint Staff and the unified combatant commands. He hopes to increase the number of general officers to 36: two generals, six lieutenant generals, 12 major generals, and 16 brigadier generals.

Transfers from the Air Force (2020–2021) 

The Space Force was established by redesignating the United States Air Force's Air Force Space Command (AFSPC) as the United States Space Force on 20 December 2020. Thus, the very first general officers in the Space Force were general officers in the Air Force's space operations and space acquisitions career fields. Immediately after the establishment of the Space Force, then-AFSPC commander, General John W. Raymond, was appointed as the first chief of space operations. He then became the first member of the new service, and hence the very first general officer in the Space Force.

By July 2020, four U.S. Air Force major generals were nominated for transfer to the Space Force and promotion to lieutenant generals. On 14 August 2020, then-Major General B. Chance Saltzman transferred to the Space Force and was promoted to lieutenant general, becoming the service's lieutenant general and the first general officer promoted in the new service. Three days later, then-Major General Nina Armagno also transferred to the Space Force and was promoted to lieutenant general, becoming the service's first female general officer.

On 1 October 2020, then-U.S. Air Force lieutenant general David D. Thompson transferred into the Space Force and was promoted to general, becoming the first to hold the office of vice chief of space operations.

In April 2021, three U.S. Air Force major generals and six brigadier generals were nominated for transfer into the Space Force, all of them career space professionals working either space operations or space acquisitions. On May 7, 2021, Major General DeAnna Burt transferred to the Space Force, becoming the first major general of the service.

On 19 October 2021, U.S. Air Force Brigadier General Gregory Gagnon transferred into the Space Force after volunteering. A career intelligence and cyber officer, he is the first general officer of the service who is a non-career space professional, or not coming from either space operations or space acquisitions career fields.

First direct promotions and expansion (2021–present)
The Space Force had transferred 17 general officers from the Air Force. By October 2021, after the transfers from the Air Force, the Space Force had 21 general officers: two generals, six lieutenant generals, three major generals, and 10 brigadier generals. This included the first officers promoted into general officer ranks since the creation of the service. In January 2021, four colonels were nominated for promotion to brigadier general, becoming the first Space Force general officers who were promoted directly as brigadier generals in the service.

In 2022, the number of major generals in the Space Force doubled from three to seven. Five colonels were nominated for promotion to brigadier general, bringing the total number of general officers to 24.

Timeline

Historical firsts
 John W. Raymond, first general and first chief of space operations
 B. Chance Saltzman, first lieutenant general and the first general officer promoted into the Space Force
 Nina Armagno, first female general officer
 William Liquori, first Space Force general officer to retire
 John E. Shaw, first general officer with a joint duty assignment
 DeAnna Burt, first major general
 Gregory Gagnon, first general officer from a non-space professional career field
 Dennis Bythewood, first organic Space Force general officer

See also
List of United States Space Force four-star generals
List of United States Space Force lieutenant generals

References

Notes

Sources

Lists of American military personnel
United States Space Force lists
United States Space Force
United States Space Force general officers